Faradonbeh (also Romanized as Farādonbeh; also known as Farādombeh, Fara Dumbeh, Farah Dombeh, and Parā Donbeh) is an old city in the Central District of Borujen County, Chaharmahal and Bakhtiari province, Iran. At the 2006 census, its population was 12,697 in 2,823 households. The following census in 2011 counted 13,139 people in 3,435 households. The latest census in 2016 showed a population of 13,317 people in 3,808 households. The city is populated by Turkic people.

References 

Borujen County

Cities in Chaharmahal and Bakhtiari Province

Populated places in Chaharmahal and Bakhtiari Province

Populated places in Borujen County